Paola Paggi (born 6 December 1976 in Ivrea, Piedmont) is a volleyball player from Italy, who represented her native country in two consecutive Summer Olympics, starting in 2000. She was a member of the Women's National Team, that won the title at the 2002 FIVB Women's World Championship in Germany. Paggi made her debut for Italy on 22 May 1999 against Cuba.

She won the 2008–09 CEV Cup playing with Asystel Novara and was awarded "Best Blocker".

Clubs
 Volley Vicenza (1996–2002)
 Volley Bergamo (2002–2007)
  Asystel Novara (2008–2009)
 Volley Universal Modena (2010 - today)

Awards

Individuals
 2008–09 CEV Cup "Best Blocker"

Clubs
 2008-09 CEV Cup -  Champion, with Asystel Novara

References

External links
  Profile
  LegaVolley

1976 births
Living people
People from Ivrea
Italian women's volleyball players
Volleyball players at the 2000 Summer Olympics
Olympic volleyball players of Italy
Sportspeople from the Metropolitan City of Turin